The 2nd Fußball-Bundesliga (women) 2008–09 is the 5th season of the 2. Fußball-Bundesliga (women), Germany's second football league. It began on 7 September 2008 and will end on 24 May 2009. After the last season the women's section of TuS Köln rrh. passed their license for the league to Bayer 04 Leverkusen.

North

South

Relegation play-offs

References 

2008-09
Ger
2
Women2